Fred Hutchinson (May 13, 1886 – February 28, 1954), nicknamed "Pudge", was an American Negro league shortstop between 1907 and 1925.

A native of Indianapolis, Indiana, Hutchinson made his Negro leagues debut in 1907 for the Indianapolis ABCs. He went on to enjoy a long career with several teams, including the Chicago American Giants and Bacharach Giants, and returned to Indianapolis to conclude his career in 1925. Hutchinson died in Indianapolis in 1954 at age 67.

References

External links
 and Baseball-Reference Black Baseball stats and Seamheads

1886 births
1954 deaths
Bacharach Giants players
Chicago American Giants players
Indianapolis ABCs players
Leland Giants players
20th-century African-American people
Baseball infielders